Jake Dillon (born 13 January 1993) is an Irish hurler who plays as a right wing-forward for the Waterford senior team.

Born in Waterford, Dillon first played competitive hurling whilst at school in De La Salle College. He arrived on the inter-county scene at the age of seventeen when he first linked up with the Waterford minor team, before later lining out with the under-21 side. He made his senior debut in the 2013 National Hurling League. Dillon has since gone on to play a key role in the forwards for Waterford, however, he has yet to claim any silverware.

At club level Dillon is a one-time Munster medallist with De La Salle. He has also won two championship medals.

Career statistics

Honours

De La Salle College
All-Ireland Colleges' Senior Hurling Championship (1): 2008
Munster Colleges' Senior Hurling Championship (1): 2008

Waterford Institute of Technology 
Fitzgibbon Cup (1): 2014

De La Salle
Munster Senior Club Hurling Championship (1): 2010
Waterford Senior Hurling Championship (2): 2010, 2012

Waterford
National Hurling League (1): 2015
Munster Minor Hurling Championship (1): 2009

References

1993 births
Living people
Waterford IT hurlers
De La Salle hurlers
Waterford inter-county hurlers
People educated at De La Salle College Waterford